Agnes of France (c. 1260 – 19 December 1327) was Duchess of Burgundy by marriage to Robert II, Duke of Burgundy. She served as regent of Burgundy during the minority of her son's reign in 1306–1311.

Life
She was the youngest daughter of King Louis IX of France and Margaret of Provence of the Royal House of Barcelona. She was the youngest of eleven children, eight of whom lived to adulthood. As a daughter of the King of France, she was born a Princess.

She married Robert II, Duke of Burgundy in 1279, and became the mother of eight children. 

On the death of her husband in 1306, Agnes served as regent of Burgundy for her minor son Hugh until he reached adulthood in 1311. 

She died at Côte d'Or, December 1327, and is buried at Abbaye de Cîteaux.

Issue
Hugh V, Duke of Burgundy (1282–1315).
Blanche (1288–1348), married Edward, Count of Savoy
Margaret (1290–1315), married king Louis X of France
Joan (ca.1290–1348), married Philip, count of Maine and Valois later Philip VI of France
Odo IV, Duke of Burgundy (1295–1350)
Louis, King of Thessalonica (1297–1316), married Matilda of Hainaut.
Mary (1298–1336) married Edward I, Count of Bar
Robert, Count of Tonnerre (1302–1334), married Joanna, heiress of Tonnerre.

References

References

1260 births
1327 deaths
13th-century French people
13th-century French women
14th-century French people
14th-century French women
14th-century viceregal rulers
14th-century women rulers
French princesses
Duchesses of Burgundy
House of Capet
Daughters of kings
Children of Louis IX of France
Regents
Female regents